Coq is an interactive theorem prover first released in 1989. It allows for expressing mathematical assertions, mechanically checks proofs of these assertions, helps find formal proofs, and extracts a certified program from the constructive proof of its formal specification. Coq works within the theory of the calculus of inductive constructions, a derivative of the calculus of constructions. Coq is not an automated theorem prover but includes automatic theorem proving tactics (procedures) and various decision procedures.

The Association for Computing Machinery awarded Thierry Coquand, Gérard Huet, Christine Paulin-Mohring, Bruno Barras, Jean-Christophe Filliâtre, Hugo Herbelin, Chetan Murthy, Yves Bertot, and Pierre Castéran with the 2013 ACM Software System Award for Coq.

The name "Coq" is a wordplay on the name of Thierry Coquand, Calculus of Constructions or "CoC" and follows the French computer science tradition of naming software after animals (coq in French meaning rooster).

Overview 
When viewed as a programming language, Coq implements a dependently typed functional programming language; when viewed as a logical system, it implements a higher-order type theory. The development of Coq has been supported since 1984 by INRIA, now in collaboration with École Polytechnique, University of Paris-Sud, Paris Diderot University, and CNRS. In the 1990s, ENS Lyon was also part of the project. The development of Coq was initiated by Gérard Huet and Thierry Coquand, and more than 40 people, mainly researchers, have contributed features to the core system since its inception. The implementation team has successively been coordinated by Gérard Huet, Christine Paulin-Mohring, Hugo Herbelin, and Matthieu Sozeau. Coq is mainly implemented in OCaml with a bit of C. The core system can be extended by way of a plug-in mechanism.

The name  means 'rooster' in French and stems from a French tradition of naming research development tools after animals. Up until 1991, Coquand was implementing a language called the Calculus of Constructions and it was simply called CoC at this time. In 1991, a new implementation based on the extended Calculus of Inductive Constructions was started and the name was changed from CoC to Coq in an indirect reference to Coquand, who developed the Calculus of Constructions along with Gérard Huet and contributed to the Calculus of Inductive Constructions with Christine Paulin-Mohring.

Coq provides a specification language called Gallina ("hen" in Latin, Spanish, Italian and Catalan).
Programs written in Gallina have the weak normalization property, implying that they always terminate.
This is a distinctive property of the language, since infinite loops (non-terminating programs) are common in other programming languages,
and is one way to avoid the halting problem.

As an example, a proof of commutativity of addition on natural numbers in Coq:

plus_comm =
fun n m : nat =>
nat_ind (fun n0 : nat => n0 + m = m + n0)
  (plus_n_0 m)
  (fun (y : nat) (H : y + m = m + y) =>
   eq_ind (S (m + y))
     (fun n0 : nat => S (y + m) = n0)
     (f_equal S H)
     (m + S y)
     (plus_n_Sm m y)) n
     : forall n m : nat, n + m = m + n

Notable uses

Four color theorem and SSReflect extension
Georges Gonthier of Microsoft Research in Cambridge, England and Benjamin Werner of INRIA used Coq to create a surveyable proof of the four color theorem, which was completed in 2002.  Their work led to the development of the SSReflect ("Small Scale Reflection") package, which was a significant extension to Coq. Despite its name, most of the features added to Coq by SSReflect are general-purpose features and are not limited to the computational reflection style of proof. These features include:

 Additional convenient notations for irrefutable and refutable pattern matching, on inductive types with one or two constructors
 Implicit arguments for functions applied to zero arguments, which is useful when programming with higher-order functions
 Concise anonymous arguments
 An improved set tactic with more powerful matching
 Support for reflection

SSReflect 1.11 is freely available, dual-licensed under the open source CeCILL-B or CeCILL-2.0 license, and compatible with Coq 8.11.

Other applications
CompCert: an optimizing compiler for almost all of the C programming language which is largely programmed and proven correct in Coq.
Disjoint-set data structure: correctness proof in Coq was published in 2007.
Feit–Thompson theorem: formal proof using Coq was completed in September 2012.

See also

Calculus of constructions
Curry–Howard correspondence
Intuitionistic type theory
List of proof assistants

References

External links

The Coq proof assistant – the official English website
coq/coq – the project's source code repository on GitHub
JsCoq Interactive Online System – allows Coq to be run in a web browser, without the need for any software installation
Alectryon – a library to process Coq snippets embedded in documents, showing goals and messages for each Coq sentence
Coq Wiki
Mathematical Components library – widely used library of mathematical structures, part of which is the SSReflect proof language
Constructive Coq Repository at Nijmegen
Math Classes

 Textbooks
The Coq'Art – a book on Coq by Yves Bertot and Pierre Castéran
Certified Programming with Dependent Types – online and printed textbook by Adam Chlipala
Software Foundations – online textbook by Benjamin C. Pierce et al.
An introduction to small scale reflection in Coq – a tutorial on SSReflect by Georges Gonthier and Assia Mahboubi
 Tutorials
Introduction to the Coq Proof Assistant – video lecture by Andrew Appel at Institute for Advanced Study
Video tutorials for the Coq proof assistant by Andrej Bauer.

Proof assistants
Free theorem provers
Dependently typed languages
Educational math software
OCaml software
Free software programmed in OCaml
Functional languages
Programming languages created in 1984
1989 software
Extensible syntax programming languages